and stylized as B'T X, is a manga series, written and illustrated by Masami Kurumada. It was serialized in Shōnen Ace from 1994 to 2000. The series is set in a fictional universe where science has progressed to the creation of mechanical AI creatures known as B'ts. An anime adaptation containing 25 episodes was aired in Japan between April and September 1996, followed by a sequel containing 14 episodes called  which was made between August to November 1997. The anime series strayed off from the manga series in Neo, giving its own conclusion to the show. The anime series was animated by TMS Entertainment; a total number of 39 episodes was produced.

Synopsis

Setting
B't X is set on an alternate Earth, where a faction known as the Machine Empire rules a significant large piece of land known as "The Area" in the Gobi Desert. The Machine Empire invests highly in scientific advancements and schools children from an early age to become striving scientists. Mechanical engineering have culminated in the creation of cyborgs and most recently mechanical beasts, powered by human blood, the Bt. The series mostly takes place in the Machine Empire, but also on Kamui island, where the main characters were born. An island that was created from a crashed meteor and contains a piece of a sun, far underground.

A B't (pronounced "beat") is the ultimate form of mecha designed for fighting - the B stands for Brain, Blood, Bravery and Battler. They have different forms and powers, usually based on mythological creatures. The B't's source of power is a device called BreakHeart, which is fueled by human blood. Once the BreakHeart is inserted into the B't's body, it creates a link between the blood donor and the B't. A B't is also outfitted with the Guard System, which protects its donor from various dangers and environment changes, such as volcanic heat, the crushing pressures beneath the ocean, or even the depths of space. However, the donor must be in physical contact with his or her B't for the system to work for them. Teppei is able to manifest a suit of protective armor called Battle Gear through use of the Messiah Fist. This has the additional benefit of activating the usually dormant wings on X's sides, enabling him to reach even greater degrees of speed and mobility.

Plot
Teppei Takamiya is the caretaker of a farm located in Kamui Island, north of Japan. His older brother, Kotarō Takamiya, leaves to study robotics in Germany and becomes one of the most brilliant scientists in the world. Five years later, the two brothers reunite at a robotics convention in Mechatopia, China, where Kotarō is to announce his latest breakthrough in artificial intelligence. The convention goes awry when Kotarō is captured by the malevolent Machine Empire and taken to "The Area". Teppei manages to hitch a ride on his brother's capturer and reaches the Machine Empire, Teppei is attacked by Metalface, one of the Empire's soldiers. Unable to win, Teppei is thrown, bleeding, in the Empire's junkyard. His blood reaches the trashed body of X, who was once considered one of the strongest B't of the Empire, and the disgruntled B't awakens. Faced with unanswered questions and imminent destruction, X reluctantly saves Teppei, and the pair flee the Area with soldiers of the Empire in hot pursuit.

Meanwhile, inside the Area, Kotarō discovers that he has been summoned by another of the Empire's soldiers, Major Aramis, to find a way to stop the ultimate B't - a creation known as Raffaello (ラファエロ) that has begun a terrifying and uncontrollable evolution. Teppei's main goal is to save his brother, but as he and X venture further into the Area and learn more about the Machine Empire they start to fight for the survival of the human race. On the way to the center of the Empire they gain allies that help them prevail over the guardians of the empire. The ultimate B't eventually finalizes its evolution and the Machine Emperor appears. Before the emperor can fuse with Raffaello, Teppei and his allies confront him.

Voice cast

Media

Manga
B't X by Masami Kurumada was serialized in Shōnen Ace from 1994 to 2000, with the 63 individual chapters published into 16 tankōbon volumes by Kadokawa Shoten.

The manga was released in North America by Tokyopop. When B't X was released in America by Tokyopop, all of the sound effects in the manga were printed in Japanese, just as in the original version and in most other Tokyopop Manga, with the addition of English captions.

Volume list

The series was also republished by Home-sha, a Shueisha company, in an edition of more than 300-pages per volume.

Home-sha (Home-sha manga bunko) (2002)

Anime
An anime adaptation containing 25 episodes aired in Japan between April and September 1996, this series adapts the first six tankōbon volumes of the manga. A second season, titled , consisted of 14 episodes. Neo aired between 21 August and 20 November 1997; this season adapts some chapters of the manga but has a derivative storyline and an alternate ending.

Originally licensed by Texas-based anime licensing company Illumitoon Entertainment and published on DVD via Westlake Entertainment. Two dual-audio DVDs were released by Westlake, covering the first eight episodes, before being cancelled. The first 14 episodes, the only ones to be dubbed, were available on-demand via the Anime Network. The license was eventually transferred to Anime Midstream after Illumitoon went defunct. Anime Midstream announced on 14 August 2016 during their panel at the AnimeFest convention in Dallas, that they would redistribute the whole series with the Japanese language track, subtitles, and an English dub. They released the series on DVD with both English subtitles and a new English dub on 3 August 2018. On 12 April 2019, Anime Midstream announced that they would release the OVA series B't X Neo on DVD in dual audio on 26 April 2019.

Season 1: B't X (1996)

Season 2: B't X Neo (1997)

Other media
A B't X themed Pachinko game was released in 2013, with newly recorded music and animation done by TMS.

Two toy-lines were produced by Takara in conjunction with the broadcast of the series. The first series consisted of 5 models of four of the main B'ts, and where marketed with the term "Solid Scan". Each Bt had removable armor and an accompanying figure to ride them. A wield-able "Messiah Fist" was also produced with sound-effects and light-up features. The second toyline was produced as action figures and included 14 B'ts with an accompanying smaller figure. 8 non-articulated figures were also released of several main characters under the term "Donor".

Reception
Chris Beveridge of Mania.com reviewed the first DVD volume of the anime series by Illumitoon Entertainment and gave the volume a "C" grade citing that "due to age there isn't a lot to expect" in regards to both audio and visual quality. Beveridge continued to praise the story but also said that it was sometimes confusing. Ilumitoon's decision to use their dubbed script as subtitles for the Japanese audio was heavily criticized as they did not match up.

References

Further reading

External links
Masami Kurumada's official website (Author's website)
TMS Entertainment (Animation Production Studio)

1996 anime television series debuts
1996 Japanese novels
1997 anime television series debuts
Adventure anime and manga
Kadokawa Shoten manga
Kadokawa Dwango franchises
Light novels
Masami Kurumada
Shōnen manga
Science fiction anime and manga
TBS Television (Japan) original programming
Tokyopop titles
TMS Entertainment